My House is a documentary/reality series focusing on ball culture in New York City. It follows Tati 007, Alex Mugler, Jelani Mizrahi, Lolita Balenciaga, Relish Milan, and the commentator Precious Ebony. The series premiered on Viceland on April 25, 2018, and consists of ten episodes.

Episodes

Distribution
My House began airing in France on Viceland via Canal+ on September 9, 2018. The episodes were all uploaded to YouTube in fall 2019.

Reception
Entertainment Tonight listed the premiere among its "obsessions" for the week and called the series "essential viewing" before Pose. The New York Times "Watching" newsletter said it "will vogue its way into your heart". In 2018, it won the MIPCOM Diversify TV's Excellence Award for Representation of LGBTQ in the Non-Scripted category over Channel 4's Genderquake and RTÉ's My Trans Life. The show was nominated in the category for Outstanding Documentary for the 30th GLAAD Media Awards.

See also
 List of programs broadcast by Viceland
 List of reality television programs with LGBT cast members

References

Further reading

External links

 

2010s American LGBT-related television series
2018 American television series debuts
Ball culture
Television shows set in New York City
Transgender-related television shows
Viceland original programming
American LGBT-related reality television series
2010s LGBT-related reality television series